Father and Son is a 1929 American pre-Code drama film directed by Erle C. Kenton from a story by Elmer Harris. The film was produced by Harry Cohn for Columbia Pictures.

Premise 
Wealthy businessman and widower Frank Fields departs for Europe, leaving his son Jimmy in the charge of Miss White, a nextdoor neighbor.

Cast 
Jack Holt as Frank Fields
Dorothy Revier as Grace Moore
Helene Chadwick as Miss White
Mickey McBan as Jimmy Fields
Wheeler Oakman as Anton Lebau

Production 
Production for Father and Son began by Columbia Pictures on February 23, 1929.

References

External links 
The New York Times contemporary review
 
 

Films directed by Erle C. Kenton
American drama films
1929 drama films
1929 films
American black-and-white films
1920s English-language films
1920s American films